Dallas Walker (born February 22, 1988) is an American football tight end who is currently a free agent.

College
Walker played college football at Western Michigan University (WMU). He initially spent a redshirt season at the University of Memphis before transferring to the Georgia Military College junior college. Walker transferred to WMU for the 2009 season and spent three seasons for the Broncos.

Professional career

Georgia Rampage
Walker signed with the Georgia Rampage of the Ultimate Indoor Football League (UIFL) in 2013.

San Diego Chargers
Walker was signed by the San Diego Chargers in April 2013. On August 25, 2013, he was released by the Chargers.

Dallas Cowboys
On July 17, 2014, the Dallas Cowboys signed Walker.

Carolina Panthers
The Carolina Panthers signed Walker on August 25, 2015. The team waived him on August 30.

References

External links
 Western Michigan profile

1988 births
Living people
American football tight ends
Dallas Cowboys players
Carolina Panthers players
Georgia Rampage players
San Diego Chargers players
Western Michigan Broncos football players
People from Madison, Mississippi
Players of American football from Memphis, Tennessee
Players of American football from Mississippi